Algérien was a  originally named USS Cronin (DE-107) after Cornelius Cronin, a sailor who was awarded the Medal of Honor during the American Civil War. She was transferred to the Free French Naval Forces in 1944 and became part of the French Navy post-war. She was rated as a frigate in French service. She was renamed Oise in 1962 and scrapped in 1965.

History

World War II
During World War II, Cronin was transferred to the Free French Naval Forces under lend lease on 23 January 1944, and renamed Algérien.

Algérien participated in Operation Anvil-Dragoon on 15 August 1944.

Ownership of the vessel was transferred to France on 21 April 1952 under the Mutual Defense Assistance Program. She was renamed Oise shortly before being transferred back to the US Navy.

See also
List of escorteurs of the French Navy

References

External links
 

Cannon-class destroyer escorts of the United States Navy
Ships built in Wilmington, Delaware
1943 ships
Cannon-class destroyer escorts of the Free French Naval Forces
World War II frigates of France
Cold War frigates of France
Cannon-class destroyer escorts of the French Navy
Ships built by Dravo Corporation